The Trio of Doom was a short-lived jazz fusion power trio consisting of John McLaughlin on guitar, Jaco Pastorius on bass, and Tony Williams on drums. They were brought together by Columbia Records in 1979 to play the Havana Jam festival in Cuba alongside Billy Joel, Kris Kristofferson, Rita Coolidge, and others.

They were named by Pastorius. He had earlier called his bass the "Bass of Doom," because of its growling sound.

Their only live performance was on March 3, 1979, and it is recorded on Ernesto Juan Castellanos's documentary Havana Jam '79.

On March 8, 1979, the group reconvened in New York City to record the songs they had played live, but a dispute broke out between Pastorius and Williams that ended the trio. 

An album was released on June 26, 2007, on Legacy Recordings, containing five tracks from Havana Jam and five recorded in the studio.

Trio of Doom (album)

Tracklist
 "Drum Improvisation (live)" (Tony Williams) – 2:46
 "Dark Prince (live)" (John McLaughlin) – 6:36
 "Continuum (live)" (Jaco Pastorius) – 5:11
 "Para Oriente (live)" (Tony Williams) – 5:42
 "Are You the One? Are You the One? (live)" (John McLaughlin) – 4:51
 "Dark Prince" (John McLaughlin) – 4:11
 "Continuum" (Jaco Pastorius) – 3:49
 "Para Oriente" (alternate take one) (Tony Williams) – 1:05
 "Para Oriente" (alternate take two) (Tony Williams) – 0:20
 "Para Oriente" (Tony Williams) – 5:28

Tracks 1–5 were recorded on 3 March 1979, at the Karl Marx Theater, Havana, Cuba. Tracks 6–10 were recorded on 8 March 1979, at CBS Studios, New York.

References

American jazz ensembles from New York City
Jazz fusion ensembles
American musical trios